The Regulator Movement, also known as the Regulator Insurrection, War of Regulation, and War of the Regulation, was an uprising in Provincial North Carolina from 1766 to 1771 in which citizens took up arms against colonial officials, whom they viewed as corrupt. Though the rebellion did not change the power structure, some historians consider it a catalyst to the American Revolutionary War. Others like John Spencer Bassett take the view that the Regulators did not wish to change the form or principle of their government, but simply wanted to make the colony's political process more equal. They wanted better economic conditions for everyone, instead of a system that heavily benefited the colonial officials and their network of plantation owners mainly near the coast. Bassett interprets the events of the late 1760s in Orange and surrounding counties as "...a peasants' rising, a popular upheaval."

Causes of rebellion

Population increase and new settlers arrive
Provincial North and South Carolina experienced dramatic population growth in the 1760s, following the increased migration of colonists arriving from the eastern cities seeking greater opportunities in the emerging rural west. The inland section of the colonies had once been predominantly composed of planters with an agricultural economy. Merchants and lawyers began to move west, upsetting the social and political structure. They were joined by new Scots-Irish immigrants, who populated the backcountry.

Economic depression
At the same time, the local inland agricultural community suffered from a deep economic depression because of severe droughts throughout the previous decade. The loss of crops cost farmers their food source as well as their primary means of income, which led many to rely on the goods being brought by newly arrived merchants. Due to income loss, the local planters often fell into debt. The merchants, in turn, relied on lawyers and the court to settle disputes. Debts were common at the time, and from 1755 to 1765, the cases brought to the docket increased nearly sixteen-fold, from seven annually to 111 in Orange County, North Carolina, alone.

Class war and political corruption
Such court cases could often lead to planters losing their homes and property, so they grew to resent the presence of the newcomers. The shift in population and politics eventually led to an imbalance within the colony's courthouses, and the new and well-educated lawyers used their superior knowledge of the law to their sometimes unjust advantage. A small clique of wealthy officials formed an exclusive inner circle in charge of the legal affairs of the area. The group was seen as a "courthouse ring" made up of officials who grabbed most of the political power for themselves. The abuse of the justice system was exacerbated by the tax-collecting local sheriffs supported by the courts. In many cases, the sheriffs and the courts held sole control over their local regions. Historian William S. Powell writes that these local officials were perceived to be "unjust and dishonest", having engaged in extortion, embezzlement, and other schemes to benefit themselves.

One early protest was the Nutbush Address, given by George Sims on June 6, 1765. George was from Nutbush (later Williamsboro, North Carolina). This address was a protest about provincial and county officials and the fees they charged residents of Granville County. This later led to the "Regulator Movement" in North Carolina.

Regulators organize and arrival of Governor Tryon
In 1764, several thousand people from North Carolina, mainly from Orange, Granville, and Anson counties in the western region, were dissatisfied with the wealthy North Carolina officials, whom they considered cruel, arbitrary, tyrannical and corrupt. With the arrival of Royal Governor William Tryon in 1765, volatile conditions in North Carolina increasingly worsened. Many of the officers were greedy and often would band together with other local officials for their own personal gain. The entire system depended on the integrity of local officials, many of whom engaged in extortion; taxes collected often enriched the tax collectors directly. The system was endorsed by Governor Tryon, who feared losing the support of the various county officials.

The effort to eliminate the system of government became known as the Regulator Uprising, War of the Regulation, or the Regulator War. The most heavily affected areas were said to be those of Rowan, Anson, Orange, Granville, Cumberland, and Dobbs counties. It was a struggle between mostly lower-class citizens, who made up the majority of the backcountry population of North and South Carolina, and the wealthy planter elite, who comprised about 5% of the population but maintained almost total control of the government.

The stated primary aim of the Regulators was to form an honest government and reduce taxation. The wealthy businessmen/politicians who ruled North Carolina saw it as a threat to their power. Ultimately, they brought in the militia to crush the rebellion and hanged its leaders. It is estimated that out of the 8,000 people living in Orange County at the time, some 6,000 to 7,000 supported the Regulators.

Regulator leadership under Herman Husband

Herman Husband became one of the unofficial leaders of the Regulators. Husband was from Maryland, born into a Quaker family. One of the major flaws in Husband's campaign was he tried to invite good relations with the eastern regions of North Carolina, mostly unaffected by the issues with local sheriffs. Husband retained very little control over the Regulators, who generally went against his policies of winning over public sentiment and committed acts of minor violence at regular intervals.

Another Regulator leader was James Hunter. He refused to take command of the Regulators after Husband's departure before the Battle of Alamance. Captain Benjamin Merrill had about 300 men under his control and would have assumed control over military leadership after James Hunter, but he was unable to serve in the Battle of Alamance.

Anti-Regulator forces

Governor Arthur Dobbs, who wrote such popular works as Trade and Improvement of H'elend and Captain Middleton's Defense, served as the Royal Governor of North Carolina until his death in 1765. William Tryon succeeded him. Tryon had a lavish home built in 1770 in New Bern. This was resented by the Regulators, who were already paying substantial taxes. William (The Regulator) Butler was quoted as saying, "We are determined not to pay the Tax for the next three years, for the Edifice or Governor's House, nor will we pay for it."

Governor Josiah Martin succeeded Governor Tryon in office just after the end of the rebellion. His policies eased the burden on former Regulators and allowed them to be assimilated back into society.
Edmund Fanning was the main opposition to the Regulators. A graduate of Yale College, he was generally regarded by his friends as well-disciplined and firm. He held many political offices in Orange County. He was once found guilty of embezzling money (along with Francis Nash) but was fined only one penny per charge.

Events

Breaking up the provincial court
North Carolina's colonial court met in Hillsborough. In 1768, the Regulators entered Hillsborough, broke up the court, and dragged those they saw as corrupt officials through the streets.  The mob attempted to have the judge try the cases that were pending against several Regulator leaders, including Husband. The presiding Judge Richard Henderson quickly adjourned the court until the next morning to avoid being forced to make a ruling in the presence of an angry mob of Regulators, and escaped in the night. The Regulators rioted, destroying public and private property alike. Fanning was among the lawyers beaten, found after taking refuge in a shop neighboring the courthouse. According to Judge Henderson, Fanning's beating was so severe that "one of his eyes was almost beaten out." The courthouse was systematically and symbolically vandalized. Human waste was placed on the judge's seat, and the body of a long deceased slave was placed upon the lawyers' bar. The mob continued to destroy shops and property in the town, and ultimately brought their destruction to Fanning's personal residence. After destroying all of the furniture and drinking all of his alcohol, they picked apart his entire house. Henderson's barn, along with his stables and home, were burned to the ground. They cracked the church bell of the Church of England but stopped short of looting the church.

Documents 
There were several different publications and petitions circulated to promote the end of taxation and other issues. A number of influential members of the area communities signed the Regulator Advertisement and the Regulator Petition, of which there were several versions of each. Each document identified concerns and issues relevant to the Regulator Movement. The terms Regulation and Regulator were introduced in the Regulator Advertisement in 1768.

Battle of Alamance

While small acts of violence had been taking place for some time, mainly out of resentment, the first organized conflict was in Mecklenburg County in 1765. Settlers in the region, who were there illegally, forced away surveyors of the region assigned with designating land. Minor clashes followed for the next several years in almost every western county, but the only true battle of the war was the Battle of Alamance on May 16, 1771.

Governor Tryon and his forces, which numbered just over 1,000, with roughly 150 officers, arrived at Hillsborough on May 9, 1771. At the same time, General Hugh Waddell, supporting the governor, en route with a contingent of 236 militia, was met by a large contingent of Regulators under the leadership of Captain Benjamin Merrill. Realizing his force was outnumbered, he fell back to Salisbury. Two days later, on May 11, 1771, having received word of the retreat from a messenger, Tryon sent the force to support General Waddell. He intentionally chose a path which would lead his forces through Regulator territory. He gave strict orders that nothing was to be looted or damaged. By May 14, 1771, his militia troops had reached Alamance and set up camp. Leaving about 70 men behind to guard the position, he moved the remainder of his force, slightly under 1,000 men, to find the Regulators.

The general Regulator strategy was to scare the governor with a show of superior numbers in order to force the governor to give in to their demands. The first clash of the battle was on May 15, 1771, when a rogue band of Regulators captured two of the governor's militia soldiers. Governor Tryon had informed the Regulators that they were displaying open arms and rebellion and that action was to be taken if they did not disperse. The Regulators did not understand the severity of the crisis they were in and ignored the warning. Despite hesitation from his own forces, Governor Tryon allegedly initiated the main battle of Alamance the next day, on May 16, 1771, by shooting Robert Thompson, who was the first death of the battle. The Regulators' resistance soon crumbled. The battle was over with nine deaths for the governor's forces and about the same for the Regulators. Virtually everyone captured in the battle was fully pardoned in exchange for an allegiance to the crown. Six Regulators were, however, hanged for their part in the uprising, including some officers of the colonial militia who had joined ranks with the Regulator's side. Those officers were Captain Robert Messer, Captain Benjamin Merrill, and Captain Robert Matear.

Aftermath
Following the battle, Tryon's militia army traveled through Regulator territory, where he had Regulators and Regulator sympathizers sign loyalty oaths and destroyed the properties of the most active Regulators. He also raised taxes to pay for his militia's defeat of the Regulators.

At the time of their defeat at Alamance, public opinion was decidedly against the Regulators. They were seen as "lawless desperadoes," and Governor Tryon was praised for his actions in stamping out the rebellion. As news articles spread the word of his victory, Tryon was branded a hero of the colonies for defeating the larger group of Regulators with his small, well prepared militia. However as the initial excitement over the battle died down, many newsmen, especially in the Boston area, began to question the reasons behind the rebellion and investigated further. Several reasons were found to regard the destruction of the Regulators as an act of an oppressive government. Most particularly admonished were the methods Tryon had used to win the battle. The use of a riot act and the execution of rebellion leaders after the battle was frowned upon. Reports also indicated that battlefield misconduct had taken place on the governor's side, including giving the farmers a two-hour warning period before the battle began, and subsequently breaking that agreement to bombard them with artillery fire.

Many of the main leaders remained in hiding until 1772, when they were no longer considered outlaws. Many Regulators moved further west into places such as Tennessee, notably establishing  both the Watauga Association in 1772 and the State of Franklin in 1784.

Regulation in South Carolina
At the same time as the regulation in North Carolina, the South Carolina colony had a group of men calling themselves regulators, albeit with very different goals. The regulators of the south were also farming class, landowning men who had grievances against officialdom. However their main problems stemmed not from corruption, but a lack of representation and of government-provided services such as courts and churches. These regulators found an enemy in local groups of "hunters" (who were seen as undesirables) and bandits. The South Carolina regulation helped catalyze the Revolutionary War, as the residents found the distant authority of the Parliament of Great Britain to be so late in responding to their demands.

The Regulators of South Carolina were formed during the mid-1760s and were active mainly between 1767 and 1769. During the previous decades, the population of the frontier had boomed, thanks to the planning of Governor Robert Johnson. He supported sending yeomen out to the frontier en masse to provide a buffer for the coastal cities from Cherokee attacks. The slave population grew 19% as planters began to develop larger properties for agriculture. (However, the slave population of the frontier accounted only for 8% of the total population of the colony.)

During this time, the inland settlers on the South Carolina frontier suffered more from violent crimes, including organized bandit raids. The disruption of the Cherokee war of 1760-1761 left many settlers without homes, and native raids sometimes resulted in abandonment of settler children. To sustain their families, the men went out hunting. In the colonial period on the western frontier, this was not seen as an honorable profession, and hunters were labeled as vagrants, bandits, and outlaws, and blamed for stealing livestock. Their method of "fire hunting" at night used fire to blind deer, and sometimes they mistook farmers' livestock for wild game. They left unused animal corpses, which drew wolves and scavengers closer to populated areas. Hunting also pushed well into the boundary of the local natives, the Creek Indians, exacerbating their already tense relationship with colonists. The bandits gathered until they numbered about 200. Eventually they were bold enough to attack magistrates. They dragged James Mayson, a regulator, from his home in the night. Originally made up of the hunting groups, the bandits also accepted free mulattos and blacks, fugitive slaves, and any outlaw available. Some members of the bandit network were well-established farmers.

In South Carolina, "regulators" were not rebels, but a vigilante force of propertied elite men. They co-operated with their colonial government for their entire active time. The South Carolina regulators were a much smaller organization than the mass movement in North Carolina. There were 100 known regulators, of whom 32 became justices of the peace, and 21 were militia leaders. Thirty-one owned slaves, and 14 owned 10 or more. Their primary aim was to protect themselves and their assets from bandits; their secondary purpose was to get courts, churches and schools established in their quickly growing communities. The only court in the colony was in Charleston, through which all legal documentation had to go. The inland settlers had the sympathy of the coastal elite, but the circuit court act, which would establish the jails, courts, sheriffs and 14 judicial districts, was held up by a dispute with the Parliament of Great Britain concerning the tenure of judges.

The South Carolina regulation movement was a great success. Their manifesto, written by Anglican missionary Rev. Charles Woodmason argued their case. Eventually the colonial legislature passed a series of acts that met the needs of the propertied frontiersman. These included vagrancy acts, which restricted the hunters, forbidding them to trespass on Native lands.

Coupled with the 1769 ordinance for the preservation of deer, which forbade fire hunting, the new law resulted in many hunters being whipped and banished from the area. In 1768, the Charleston grand jury began urging the creation of new schools in the back country, as per regulator request. In 1769 the circuit court act was passed, making way for the new courthouses and jails, as well as setting up four new judicial districts. The cooperation between frontier and coastal colonists was so effective that by 1771, Governor Charles Montague had issued a full pardon for any actions taken by the regulators in his state.

In popular culture
 The Regulators are featured as important characters in Jimmy Carter's historical novel The Hornet's Nest (2003).
 Diana Gabaldon features the Battle of Alamance as a significant event in her historical time-travel novel The Fiery Cross, the fifth book in the Outlander series.  The battle was featured in the 7th episode of Season 5 of Outlander (TV series).

See also
 Overmountain Victory National Historic Trail
 Gideon Gibson Jr.

References

Further reading

 Brown, Richard Maxwell. The South Carolina Regulators: The Story of the First American Vigilante Movement. Cambridge, Massachusetts: Belknap Press of Harvard University, 1963
 Gross, David (ed.) We Won't Pay!: A Tax Resistance Reader  pp. 77–79
 Hamilton, Jon Jay. Herman Husband: Penman of the Regulation. Graduate thesis. Wake Forest University, 1969.
 Hooker, Richard J. Hooker, ed. The [South] Carolina Backcountry on the Eve of the Revolution: The Journal and Other Writings of Charles Woodmason, Anglican Itinerant.  1953.  .  Also contains information on North Carolina conditions.
 Kars, Marjoleine. Breaking Loose Together: The Regulator Rebellion in Pre-Revolutionary North Carolina. Chapel Hill: University of North Carolina Press, 2002.
 Kay, Marvin L. M. "The North Carolina Regulation, 1766-1776: A Class Conflict." In The American Revolution: Explorations in the History of American Radicalism, edited by Alfred F. Young. DeKalb: Northern Illinois University Press, 1976.
 Kay, Marvin L. M., and Lorin Lee Cary. "Class, Mobility, and Conflict in North Carolina on the Eve of the Revolution." In The Southern Experience in the American Revolution, edited by Jeffrey J. Crow and Larry E. Tise. Chapel Hill: University of North Carolina Press, 1978.
 Klein, Rachel N. Unification of a Slave State: The Rise of the Planter Class in the South Carolina Backcountry, 1760-1808. Chapel Hill, NC: University of North Carolina Press, 1990.
 Nelson, Lynn A. "Historiographical Conversations about the Backcountry: Politics." Journal of Backcountry Studies. Vol II, No. 2 (Fall 2007)
 Powell, William S., James K. Huhta, and Thomas J. Farnham (eds). The Regulators in North Carolina: A Documentary History. Raleigh: State Dept. of Archives and History, 1971.
 Stewart, Cory Joe, Ph.D. The Affairs of Boston in the North Carolina Backcountry during the American Revolution. A Dissertation Submitted to the Faculty of the Graduate School at The University of North Carolina at Greensboro in Partial Fulfillment of the Requirements for the Degree Doctor of Philosophy, Greensboro, NC, 2010. 228 pp. 
Troxler, Carole Watterson. "Farming Dissenters: The Regulator Movement in Piedmont North Carolina." North Carolina Department of Cultural Resources, 2011.
 Walker, James Loy. The Regulator Movement: Sectional Controversy in North Carolina, 1765-1771. Graduate thesis. Louisiana State University, 1962.
 Whittenburg, James Penn. Backwoods Revolutionaries: Social Context and Constitutional Theories of the North Carolina Regulators, 1765-1771. Graduate thesis. University of Georgia, 1974.
 Zinn, Howard. A People's History of the United States: 1492–Present. Harper-Perennial, 2003.

External links
 Early American Review  Summer/Fall 2009
 Chapter II, Blood Shed on the Alamance in Sketches of North Carolina, Historical and Biographical, Illustrative of the Principles of a Portion of Her Early Settlers by Rev. William Henry Foote, 1846.
 Resolves of the Regulators in Chapter II, Watauga—Its Settlement and Government, in The Annals of Tennessee to the End of the Eighteenth Century by J. G. M. Ramsey, 1853.

 
Conflicts in 1766
Conflicts in 1767
Conflicts in 1768
Conflicts in 1769
Conflicts in 1770
Conflicts in 1771
1760s in North Carolina
1770s in North Carolina
18th-century rebellions
Agrarian politics
Province of North-Carolina
Rebellions against the British Empire
Rebellions in the Thirteen Colonies